Tristaniopsis polyandra is a species of plant in the family Myrtaceae. It is endemic to New Caledonia.

References

polyandra
Endemic flora of New Caledonia
Taxonomy articles created by Polbot